Napper may refer to:

Edwin Napper (1815–1895), English amateur cricketer
George Napper (1550–1610), English Roman Catholic priest
Larry C. Napper (born 1947), United States Ambassador
L.D. "Buddy" Napper (1925–2013), former Louisiana politician and semi-professional baseball player
Robert Napper (born 1966), convicted British serial killer and rapist
James Napper Tandy (1739–1803), Irish rebel leader
British Roll Deep member and MC, Murkle Man